is a Japanese former competitive figure skater. He is the 2014 Four Continents champion, 2014 Skate Canada International champion, and 2012 Trophée Éric Bompard champion. Nationally, he is a five-time Japan Championships bronze medalist and 2007 Japan Junior champion.

Personal life
Takahito Mura was born in Matsudo, Chiba, Japan. His father, Takashi, competed internationally in both singles and pairs, and his mother also competed in figure skating. In 2013, he married his wife and had a daughter, Kanna.

Career
Mura placed fifth at the 2006 World Junior Championships. He won two medals on the Junior Grand Prix circuit in 2006 and qualified for the Junior Grand Prix Final, where he placed just off the podium. He made his senior international debut at the 2008 Finlandia Trophy, which he won.

Mura won his first senior Grand Prix medal, gold, at the 2012 Trophée Éric Bompard. In the 2013-14 season, he was assigned to the 2013 Skate Canada and 2013 NHK Trophy. He placed tenth and sixth at his events. Mura finished sixth at the Japanese Nationals and was assigned to the 2014 Four Continents Championships where he won the gold.

In the 2014–15 season, Mura took silver at an ISU Challenger Series event, the Lombardia Trophy, before winning gold at his first GP assignment of the season, the 2014 Skate Canada International. His next assignment was the 2014 NHK Trophy, where he placed third overall, qualifying for the 2014–15 Grand Prix of Figure Skating Final, in Barcelona, Spain.

At the Grand Prix Final, Mura finished last in the short program and fourth in the free skate, ending fifth overall. He competed in the 2014–15 Japan Figure Skating Championships, where he finished 5th. When Tatsuki Machida retired from figure skating, Mura was named as his replacement to represent Japan at the 2015 World Figure Skating Championships, along with Yuzuru Hanyu and Takahiko Kozuka. He was also selected to represent Japan at the 2015 Four Continents Figure Skating Championships, where he finished seventh. At the World Championships, Mura finished in 16th place.

Programs

Competitive highlights 
GP: Grand Prix; CS: Challenger Series; JGP: Junior Grand Prix

References

External links 

 

Japanese male single skaters
1991 births
Living people
People from Matsudo
Asian Games medalists in figure skating
Figure skaters at the 2011 Asian Winter Games
Medalists at the 2011 Asian Winter Games
Figure skaters at the 2017 Asian Winter Games
Asian Games silver medalists for Japan
Four Continents Figure Skating Championships medalists